Krępsko may refer to:

Krępsko, Greater Poland Voivodeship (west-central Poland)
Krępsko, Złotów County in Greater Poland Voivodeship (west-central Poland)
Krępsko, West Pomeranian Voivodeship (north-west Poland)